The Nokia 1112 is a low-end GSM mobile phone sold by Nokia. The 1112 was released in 2006.

With graphical icons and large font sizes the Nokia 1112 is an easy to use mobile phone that aims at first-time mobile phone users.

As a dual-band device it operates on GSM-900/1800 or GSM-850/1900 networks.

It has a 96 x 68 pixels resolution monochrome display with white backlighting and an integrated handsfree speaker.

The cell phone has built in utilities, such as a calculator and a stopwatch and it supports polyphonic ringtones. Beside other basic features like SMS and picture messaging it has a speaking clock and alarm.

Its internal memory is 4 MB in size, most of it reserved for the 30+ low-bitrate polyphonic melodies, and also enabling it to hold up 200 phonebook entries.

The battery powers the phone for up to over 5 hours talk time, or up to 15 days if left in stand-by mode.

See also
 List of Nokia products

References

External links

 Nokia 1112 official product page 
 Nokia 1112 user guide 

1112
Mobile phones introduced in 2006
Mobile phones with user-replaceable battery